Ruh Kandi (also Romanized as Rūḩ Kandī; also known as Orūf Kandī) is a village in Qeshlaq-e Sharqi Rural District of Qeshlaq Dasht District, Bileh Savar County, Ardabil province, Iran. At the 2006 census, its population was 1,470 in 307 households. The following census in 2011 counted 1,671 people in 379 households. The latest census in 2016 showed a population of 1,576 people in 437 households; it was the largest village in its rural district.

References 

Bileh Savar County

Populated places in Ardabil Province

Populated places in Bileh Savar County

Towns and villages in Bileh Savar County